Elaphrolaelaps is a genus of mites in the family Pachylaelapidae. There are about eight described species in Elaphrolaelaps.

Species
These eight species belong to the genus Elaphrolaelaps:
 Elaphrolaelaps castaneus (Trägårdh, 1908)
 Elaphrolaelaps fenestratus (Berlese, 1910)
 Elaphrolaelaps formidabilis (Berlese, 1918)
 Elaphrolaelaps integer (Berlese, 1918)
 Elaphrolaelaps rackae Costa, 1974
 Elaphrolaelaps sternalis Ryke, 1959
 Elaphrolaelaps terrificus (Berlese, 1920)
 Elaphrolaelaps tibialis Elsen, 1974

References

Pachylaelapidae
Articles created by Qbugbot